Clara Kichenama-Gourouvaya (born 10 May 1999) is a Martiniquais footballer who plays as a defender for the Martinique women's national team.

International career
Kichenama-Gourouvaya capped for Martinique at senior level during the 2014 CONCACAF Women's Championship. 
On the club level, she plays for Emulation in Martinique.

References

Living people
Martiniquais women's footballers
Women's association football defenders
Martinique women's international footballers
1999 births